Gamma helix (or γ-helix) is a type of secondary structure in proteins that has been predicted by Pauling, Corey, and Branson, but has never been observed in natural proteins. The hydrogen bond in this type of helix was predicted to be between N-H group of one amino acid and the C=O group of the amino acid six residues earlier (or, as described by Pauling, Corey, Branson, "to the fifth amide group beyond it"). This can also be described as i + 6 → i bond and would be a continuation of the series (310 helix, alpha helix, pi helix and gamma helix). This theoretical helix contains 5.1 residues per turn.

References 

Protein structural motifs
Helices